Dario Del Fabro  (March 24, 1995 Alghero, Italy) is an Italian professional footballer who plays as a centre-back for Cittadella.

Club career

Cagliari and loans
Del Fabro was born in Alghero and grew up in Sassari. He started his career at Cagliari after being spotted by the head of the academy Gianfranco Matteoli. He made his debut in the Coppa Italia on 5 November 2012 against Pescara, playing the full 90 minutes. He made his Serie A league debut on 21 December 2012 against Juventus, coming on for Marco Sau in the 67th minute. In two years he played 8 games between Serie A and Coppa Italia with the Sardinian Club

On 3 August 2014, Del Fabro joined Serie B side Pescara on a season-long loan. The move was later terminated so that he could join Leeds United instead.

On 31 August, Del Fabro signed for former Cagliari owner Massimo Cellino at Leeds United on a season-long loan with the option of a permanent move. He was given the number 35 shirt for the 2014–15 season. On 4 January 2015, he made his début for the club in a 1–0 defeat away to Sunderland in the FA Cup.

On 20 September 2015, Del Fabro was loaned out to Serie B side Ascoli. He debuted on 23 November 2015, in a 3–0 away loss against Cagliari, coming on as a substitute for Michele Canini after 5 minutes of the first half. He ended the campaign with a total of 10 appearances.

On 10 July 2016, Del Fabro completed the loan to another Serie B team, Pisa. At the new team, managed by Gennaro Gattuso, he became one of the starting central defenders for the team from Tuscany, appearing in 32 league and 2 Coppa Italia matches.

Juventus
On 28 July 2017, Del Fabro joined Juventus for €4.5 million, signing a contract until 2023.

He was loaned to Novara for the 2017–18 season.During this season he played 19 games.

On 31 July 2018, Del Fabro joined Serie B club Cremonese on loan until 30 June 2019. It was a difficult season for the central defender that didn’t play regularly, but he scored his first professional goal in the draw 1–1 against Venice.

On 29 August 2019, Del Fabro moved to Scottish Premiership club Kilmarnock on a season-long loan deal along with fellow Juventus team-mate Laurențiu Brănescu. During his time in Ayrshire, Del Fabro became a regular in central defence with 24 appearances in all competitions and scoring one goal, a 93rd minute equaliser in a 2–2 draw with Hibernian.

On 3 October 2020, Del Fabro signed for Dutch club ADO Den Haag on a one-year loan.

On 26 August 2021, Del Fabbro signed for Belgian side Seraing on a one-year loan.

Cittadella
On 31 January 2022, Del Fabro returned to Italy and signed with Cittadella.

International career
In 2010, Del Fabro was capped by Italy under-16s where he captained the side, before graduating in 2011 to Italy under-17, and then on to Italy under-18s in 2012. In 2013, Del Fabro made his debut for Italy under-19s and scored his first goal in the "Azzurri" shirt.

Personal life
He was born in Alghero to Italian father and Polish mother.

Career statistics

References

External links

1995 births
People from Alghero
Footballers from Sardinia
Living people
Italian people of Polish descent
Italian footballers
Italy youth international footballers
Serie A players
Serie B players
Scottish Professional Football League players
Eredivisie players
Belgian Pro League players
Cagliari Calcio players
Leeds United F.C. players
Ascoli Calcio 1898 F.C. players
Pisa S.C. players
Juventus F.C. players
Novara F.C. players
U.S. Cremonese players
Kilmarnock F.C. players
Juventus Next Gen players
ADO Den Haag players
R.F.C. Seraing (1922) players
A.S. Cittadella players
Association football defenders
Expatriate footballers in Scotland
Expatriate footballers in England
Expatriate footballers in the Netherlands
Expatriate footballers in Belgium
Italian expatriate footballers
Italian expatriate sportspeople in Scotland
Italian expatriate sportspeople in England
Italian expatriate sportspeople in Belgium